Heather Hills may refer to:
 Heather Hills, a character in Jeff Kinney's book series, Diary of a Wimpy Kid
 A subdivision in the historic Belair Development